William Henry Roane (September 17, 1787May 11, 1845) was a politician from Virginia who served in the Virginia House of Delegates, the United States House of Representatives, and the United States Senate. He was the son of Judge Spencer Roane and the grandson of Founding Father Patrick Henry.

Biography
Born in Virginia, Roane pursued in preparatory studies as a young man. He was a member of the Virginia House of Delegates from 1812 to 1815 and was later elected a Democratic-Republican to the United States House of Representatives in 1814, serving from 1815 to 1817. Roane was not a candidate for reelection and instead became a member of the executive council of Virginia. He was later elected a Democrat to the United States Senate to fill a vacancy, serving from 1837 to 1841. There, he was chairman of the Committee on the District of Columbia from 1837 to 1839. After an unsuccessful bid for reelection, Roane engaged in agricultural pursuits until his death on May 11, 1845, in Tree Hill, Virginia. He was interred at Lyons Family Cemetery in Hanover County, Virginia.

External links

William H. Roane at Find A Grave

1787 births
1845 deaths
Democratic Party members of the Virginia House of Delegates
Democratic Party United States senators from Virginia
Democratic-Republican Party members of the United States House of Representatives from Virginia
People from Hanover County, Virginia
19th-century American politicians